The Los Angeles Dodgers are a Major League Baseball (MLB) team based in Los Angeles, California. The list of the Dodgers' team records includes batting and pitching records for both individual players and the team as a whole.

Individual career records
Batting statistics; pitching statistics

Individual single-season recordsBatting statistics; pitching statistics; fielding statistics

Team season records 
Games: 165 (1962)
Wins: 111 (2022)
Losses: 104 (1905)
Highest Winning Percentage: .717 (2020)
Lowest Winning Percentage: .316 (1905)

Batting records
Batting Average: .313 (1894)
Hits: 1654 (1930)
Singles: 1223 (1925)
Runs: 1021 (1894)
Doubles: 306 (2017)
Triples: 130 (1894)
Stolen Bases: 409 (1892)
Home Runs: 279 (2019)
Grand Slams: 10 (2004)
Pinch-Homers: 12 (2000)
Runs Batted In: 891 (2019)
Total Bases: 2593 (2019)
Extra-Base Hits: 541 (1953)
Slugging Percent: .483 (2020)
On-Base Percent: .378 (1894)
Hit by Pitch: 125 (1899)
Left On Base: 1278 (1947)
Walks: 732 (1947)
Intentional Bases on Balls: 91 (1956)
Most Strikeouts: 1436 (2018)
Fewest Strikeouts: 318 (1922)

Pitching records
Saves: 58 (2003)
Complete Games: 135 (1904)
Most Innings Pitched: 1491 (1973)
Most Runs Allowed: 1007 (1894)
Fewest Runs Allowed: 463 (1918)
Most Earned Runs Allowed: 743 (1929)
Fewest Earned Runs Allowed: 336 (1916)
Most Hits Allowed: 1608 (1925)
Fewest Hits Allowed: 1024 (1918)
Fewest Walks Allowed: 258 (1919)
Most Walks Allowed: 671 (1946)
Most Strikeouts: 1232 (1997)
Fewest Strikeouts: 216 (1895)
Most Shutouts: 24 (1963, 1988)
Lowest Earned Run Average: 2.12 (1916)
Most Wild Pitches: 70 (1894, 1958)
Most Homers Allowed: 192 (1999)
Fewest Homers Allowed: 10 (1902)
Most Hit Batters: 75 (2000)
Most Balks: 30 (1988)

Fielding records
Highest Fielding Percent: .988 (2004)
Lowest Fielding Percent: .924 (1891)
Most Putouts: 4480 (2005)
Fewest Putouts: 3992 (1938)
Most Assists: 1946 (1982)
Fewest Assists: 1573 (1961)
Most Total Chances: 6550 (1982)
Fewest Total Chances: 5845 (1938)
Most Errors: 432 (1891)
Fewest Errors: 73 (2004)
Most Double Plays: 198 (1958)
Fewest Double Plays: 73 (1891, 1906)
Fewest Passed Balls: 4 (1933, 1951, 1953, 1954)
Most Consecutive Errorless Games: 11 (May 5–16, 1979)

See also
List of Major League Baseball franchise postseason streaks
Los Angeles Dodgers award winners and league leaders

Notes and references

Records
Major League Baseball team records